Murt is both a surname and a given name. Notable people with the name include:

 Murt Connor (born 1951), Irish Gaelic football player
 Murt Kelly, Irish Gaelic football player
 Sita Murt (1946–2014), Catalan fashion designer and businesswoman
 Tom Murt (born 1960), American politician